The 1983 SEC women's basketball tournament took place March 3 through March 6, 1983 in Knoxville, Tennessee.

Georgia won the tournament by beating Ole Miss in the championship game.

Tournament

Asterisk denotes game ended in overtime.

All-Tournament team 
Becky Jackson, Auburn
Teresa Edwards, Georgia (MVP)
Lisa O'Connor, Georgia
Joyce Walker, LSU
Eugenia Conner, Ole Miss
Tanya Haave, Tennessee

References

SEC women's basketball tournament
1983 in sports in Tennessee
College basketball tournaments in Tennessee
Sports in Knoxville, Tennessee
Women's sports in Tennessee